Belmont Hall may refer to:

Belmont Hall (Newark, Delaware), listed on the National Register of Historic Places in New Castle County, Delaware, USA
Belmont Hall (Smyrna, Delaware), listed on the NRHP in Delaware, USA
Belmont Hall, Cheshire, grade-I-listed hall at Great Budworth, Cheshire, England

Architectural disambiguation pages